Ilkka Vaarasuo (born January 25, 1983) is a Finnish former professional ice hockey defenceman.

Career
Vaarasuo began his career with JYP, making his debut for the senior team during the 2002–03 SM-liiga season. With JYP, Vaarasuo won the Kanada-malja in 2009. The following season, he joined Jukurit of Mestis where he spent the next seven seasons, during which he had two loan spells with HIFK. He played two games for HIFK during the 2011–12 season and fifteen games during the 2012–13 season. He won two Mestis championships with Jukurit in 2015 and 2016.

Jukurit were promoted to Liiga for the 2016–17 season but Vaarasuo spent the season on loan in Mestis with his hometown team Iisalmen Peli-Karhut where he served as team captain in his final season before retiring. After ending his playing career, Vaarasuo returned to Jukurit to become team manager for their Jr. A U20 team.

References

External links

1983 births
Living people
Finnish ice hockey defencemen
HIFK (ice hockey) players
Iisalmen Peli-Karhut players
JYP-Akatemia players
JYP Jyväskylä players
Leksands IF players
Mikkelin Jukurit players
People from Iisalmi
Sportspeople from North Savo